Herbert Brewer (21 November 1876 – 1946) was a British boxer. He competed in the men's heavyweight event at the 1908 Summer Olympics.

Brewer won the Amateur Boxing Association 1899 lightweight title and the 1907 heavyweight title, boxing out of the Polytechnic Boxing Club.

References

External links
 

1876 births
1946 deaths
British male boxers
Olympic boxers of Great Britain
Boxers at the 1908 Summer Olympics
Heavyweight boxers